Jerome Brown (born November 27, 1965) is a former American football lineman who played six seasons in the Arena Football League with the Albany Firebirds, Grand Rapids Rampage and New Jersey Red Dogs. He played college football at the University of Mississippi.

References

External links
Just Sports Stats

Living people
1965 births
Players of American football from Alabama
American football offensive linemen
American football defensive linemen
African-American players of American football
Ole Miss Rebels football players
Albany Firebirds players
Grand Rapids Rampage players
New Jersey Red Dogs players
People from Monroe County, Alabama
21st-century African-American people
20th-century African-American sportspeople